Kathlen Ax (born 15 February 1993) is a Finnish handball player for HIFK Handboll and the Finnish national team.

References

1993 births
Living people
Finnish female handball players
Sportspeople from Helsinki